Amorbaea subtusvena is a moth in the family Xyloryctidae. It was described by Alexey Diakonoff in 1968. It is found on Luzon in the Philippines.

References

Xyloryctidae
Moths described in 1968
Moths of Asia